Jeanne Yvette Lopes (born on 22 July 1947) is a Dutch sport shooter. She competed in rifle shooting events at the 1988 Summer Olympics.

Olympic results

References

1947 births
Living people
ISSF rifle shooters
Dutch Antillean female sport shooters
Shooters at the 1988 Summer Olympics
Olympic shooters of the Netherlands Antilles